James Eugene Raynor is a fictional character and a major protagonist in Blizzard Entertainment's science fiction StarCraft series. Raynor is a predominant character in the science fiction real-time strategy video games StarCraft and Brood War, and is a player character in StarCraft II: Wings of Liberty. He also appears as a playable character in the crossover multiplayer online battle arena game Heroes of the Storm. Outside video games, Raynor appears in the novels Liberty's Crusade and Queen of Blades, while his backstory is explored in the novels Heaven's Devils and Devil's Due. Robert Clotworthy voices the character in all video game appearances.

Created by Chris Metzen and James Phinney, Raynor is loosely based on a character of the same name in the 1991 film Rush. Metzen conceived Raynor to represent the ordinary man in a series populated with politically motivated characters. Raynor's physical appearance was designed by Metzen himself. A Terran in his thirties, Raynor is a former soldier and outlaw who eventually becomes a marshal on a backwater colony world. Raynor joins Arcturus Mengsk's revolution against the oppressive Terran Confederacy but becomes disillusioned with Mengsk's genocidal tactics, forming his own paramilitary group to challenge Mengsk's tyranny.

The character has received a positive critical response; Raynor's depiction in StarCraft and Brood War was praised for its character depth and the quality of Clotworthy's voice acting. One survey by GameSpot put Raynor as one of the top ten heroes in video gaming.

Character design

The character of Raynor was originally devised by Chris Metzen and James Phinney, with his depiction as a rough-living and dangerous man developed through various pieces of concept art by Metzen. In an interview, Raynor's voice actor Robert Clotworthy cited one piece of this concept art in how he decided to voice the character. The art, showing Raynor on a hoverbike and outfitted with futuristic weaponry, gave Clotworthy the impression that as Raynor was someone people "wouldn't mess with", he would not have to raise his voice as "other characters [would] shut up and listen" or face the consequences. Clotworthy also stated that in the event that a StarCraft film was produced, he believed Clive Owen would be the perfect choice to play Raynor due to him "being dangerous".

Raynor's character is based on a character of the same name in the film Rush, whom Chris Metzen describes as a "gritty, undercover cop". Metzen also states that Raynor is a personal favorite character of his, as although he is only an ordinary man, he has personally met and worked with the most influential characters in the series. In StarCraft II, Raynor was again voiced by Robert Clotworthy.

The tactical shooter StarCraft: Ghost was to feature Raynor as Clotworthy stated he was brought in to voice the character; however, the game has since been canceled and Raynor's role was never revealed. Bill Roper, Blizzard North's former vice president, stated that the game would not center on Kerrigan or Raynor.

Attributes

Personality
Despite an often laid back and sarcastic demeanor, Raynor is described in the novel Liberty's Crusade as a decent and honorable man who is well liked by those under his command. Robert Clotworthy noted that as such, Raynor is always willing to do the right thing, no matter how difficult it may be. His assertion to kill Sarah Kerrigan—the series' main antagonist—despite his former love for her early in the story arc is one of the sacrifices that in Clotworthy's eyes makes Raynor a "true hero in the purest sense of the word". He is also described as being fiercely loyal to his friends and his cause, willing to put it all at risk for the protection of those who cannot defend themselves. It is this loyalty that causes deep resentment in Raynor when he is betrayed by those he had once trusted. Although often displaying an overzealous attitude, Raynor is well respected by his men as a dynamic and reliable leader who always tries to ensure his troops survive the day, even when Raynor is responsible for getting them into a bad situation. Raynor himself acknowledges that he is not the most intelligent man there is, but is shown as being extremely resourceful and persistent in the face of unfavorable odds.

Depiction

Raynor is only ever depicted by his unit portrait through the course of StarCraft and Brood War. He is later shown in StarCraft II as a physically strong yet casually dressed character, wearing his combat gear over his normal clothes, which are further described in the novels as well-worn and rough in appearance. Raynor has a neatly trimmed moustache and beard, which by the time of StarCraft II are beginning to grey. His StarCraft II model also reveals the presence of tattoos on both his arms. In addition, a number of pieces of concept art depict Raynor smoking. Unlike other characters, Raynor is not seen wearing a uniform at any point during the series, with the rare exceptions of when he is encased in marine combat armour. Raynor is often depicted riding a modified vulture hovercycle, which he uses for transport and in open land combat.

Appearances

In video games

StarCraft
Raynor's first appearance is in the 1998 title StarCraft. Raynor is a marshall on the Confederate fringe colony of Mar Sara, where he is attempting to defend the population from an expanding Zerg infestation. As the Confederacy abandons Mar Sara to its fate, Arcturus Mengsk and his rebel Sons of Korhal arrive to evacuate the colony. Thoroughly disillusioned with the Confederacy, Raynor and his colonial militia join the Sons of Korhal. During his time with the rebels, Raynor falls in love with Mengsk's second-in-command, psychic assassin Sarah Kerrigan. However, when Mengsk uses Zerg-attracting Confederate technology to destroy the Confederate capital Tarsonis and abandons Kerrigan on Tarsonis to the Zerg, Raynor and his militia desert, hijacking Mengsk's flagship Hyperion in the process. Raynor's men, labelling themselves "Raynor's Raiders", take it upon themselves to strike at Mengsk, who has crowned himself emperor of the new Terran Dominion. Soon after, Raynor is lured to the planet Char by psychic dreams. He discovers the source is Kerrigan, who has been captured and infested by the Zerg. Raynor tries to save her, but to no avail; he and his men end up stranded on Char for months. Raynor discovers a Protoss force led by high templar Tassadar and the dark templar Zeratul is also on Char, likewise attracted by Kerrigan's psychic emanations and subsequently stranded. The two groups ally and hold out against Kerrigan and the Zerg until rescue arrives with forces from the Protoss homeworld of Aiur. Raynor and his remaining Raiders accompany Tassadar back to Aiur, which has fallen prey to Zerg invasion, and help the Protoss destroy the gargantuan Zerg Overmind.

StarCraft: Brood War

Raynor returns in Brood War, having earned the trust of the Protoss and befriended the templar warrior Fenix. The Raiders and Fenix's forces remain on Aiur as a rearguard while the surviving Protoss evacuate their homeworld, now devastated and overrun by the Zerg, for the dark templar world of Shakuras. Raynor is later contacted by Kerrigan, who convinces them to join with her against the United Earth Directorate (UED), which has arrived to pacify the sector by any means necessary. Raynor and Fenix reluctantly prevent Mengsk's capture by the UED, and with Kerrigan's Zerg rout the UED from the Dominion throne world of Korhal. However, Kerrigan turns on her allies, launching a surprise attack against both the Dominion and the Raiders. Although the Hyperion escapes the planet, Fenix is killed in the attack; an outraged Raynor vows that Kerrigan will die by his hands.

StarCraft II: Wings of Liberty
The 2010 sequel Wings of Liberty takes place four years later, where the Raiders are still resisting the renewed Dominion, but are low on morale and resources, while their efforts are marginalised by Dominion media. Raynor, blaming himself for Kerrigan's transformation and Fenix's death, has started drinking. He returns to Mar Sara, where he is approached by a former associate, Tychus Findlay, with a business proposition to acquire Xel'Naga artifacts for a research group, the Moebius Foundation. The artifacts, guarded by an extremist faction of Protoss, are also sought by Kerrigan, who launches a vast invasion of the Dominion to find them. Between missions Zeratul appears and tells Raynor that Kerrigan must survive the coming battles "or all is lost", as she will be pivotal to every species surviving a coming enemy worse than even the Zerg. To prove his point he leaves a Protoss memory device, through which Raynor sees Zeratul's journey following an ancient prophecy and the vision of an alternate timeline's future. In this vision Kerrigan had died and the swarm (under control of an unknown entity) is wiping out the last remaining Protoss - with the Humans having already fallen and the Zerg being wiped out after their victory.

Eventually accumulating all the artifacts, the Raiders discover that the Moebius Foundation is a front for the heir apparent of the Dominion, Valerian Mengsk; though the Hyperion crew is concerned about having been working for their enemy, Valerian coaxes Raynor to accompany him in invading Char as the combined artifact may reverse Kerrigan's infestation. Although the Dominion takes heavy losses to the Zerg, the Raiders defend the artifact from Kerrigan until it can be activated; upon detonating, it destroys all nearby Zerg and leaves Kerrigan human again. However, Findlay, acting on orders from Arcturus Mengsk, attempts to kill the weakened Kerrigan, forcing Raynor to kill Findlay before tending to Kerrigan.

StarCraft II: Heart of the Swarm
Following the battle of Char, in Heart of the Swarm, Raynor and Kerrigan are taken to a secret lab by Valerian to evaluate the extension of Kerrigan's current power to control the Zergs, until it is attacked by Dominion forces. Raynor is captured by Nova and Mengsk declares that he was executed, much to Kerrigan's grief. However, Mengsk later contacts Kerrigan and reveals that Raynor is still alive and under his custody, using him as a leverage to have her keep the Zerg swarm, now reunited under her command, away from Dominion Territory. Kerrigan then manages to rescue Raynor with the Raiders' help and despite his rejection of Kerrigan at first for choosing to abandon her humanity in order to save him, he and his forces join the swarm for a final battle on Korhal to overthrow Mengsk, saving Kerrigan once more when the Emperor tries to destroy her with the artifact, ultimately leading to Mengsk's death at her hands. Reconciled with Kerrigan, Raynor bids farewell to her as she leaves with the Zerg swarm to confront Amon, the fallen Xel'Naga which intends to return and exterminate both the Zerg and Protoss races.

StarCraft II: Legacy of the Void
During the events of Legacy of the Void, Raynor participates in the defense of Korhal from Amon's forces alongside Artanis. He is later given a psionic call by Kerrigan to aid her and Artanis in a joint Terran Dominion/Zerg Swarm/Protoss invasion of the Void, a realm accessed from the Xel'Naga homeworld of Ulnar, to permanently kill Amon. In the aftermath of the war, Raynor disappears from public view with Kerrigan.

Heroes of the Storm 
Raynor appears as a playable character in the crossover video game Heroes of the Storm, which features various characters from Blizzard's franchises as playable heroes. He is one of many StarCraft heroes that are available in the game, and features a unique skillset including a heroic ability to summon the Hyperion to fire upon the battleground he is on. Raynor is a ranged assassin that can keep enemies away with his basic abilities. He relies on his hard-hitting physical attacks and long range to fight his enemies from a safe distance. Since he lacks any form of innate escape mechanism, like teleports or dashes, knowing when to take a fight and when to retreat is crucial to achieve good results when playing this hero. Jim Raynor is also the leading character in the game's tutorial, and one of the six Blizzard characters who appear in the Heroes of the Storm cinematic trailer.

In novels
Several StarCraft novels also feature Raynor; he is a prominent character in Liberty's Crusade, which reveals that Raynor had a wife and son. His son exhibited psychic potential and consequently is conscripted for the Confederate ghost program, where the intense training ultimately kills him. Afterward, Raynor's wife Liddy dies after a period of depression and illness. As a result, Raynor immerses himself in his work and develops a penchant for operating alone. He is also the primary protagonist in Queen of Blades, a novelization of the events of StarCraft's Episode II in which Raynor attempts to rescue Sarah Kerrigan from the Zerg on Char and eventually allies with the high templar Tassadar and renegade dark templar Zeratul, facilitating the reconciliation between the two estranged Protoss.
More recently, his early military and criminal history, including his association with Tychus Findlay, were explored in the novels Heaven's Devils and Devil's Due. Also in Devil's Due, Raynor's father died by machine error. Raynor's mother died at day when Raynor visited her.

Reception
The character of Raynor was generally well received by critics and fans alike. Gaming's Edge described Raynor as an "almost prototypical action movie figure" with a "healthy dose of arrogance" who despite always attempting to do the morally right thing invariably ends up with "the worst end of the deal" due to circumstances beyond his control. The article also puts forward the case that "it would be difficult not to admire Raynor, if for no other reason than his persistence" in the face of abandonment, isolation and betrayal. In the review of StarCraft for the magazine GamePro, the reviewer stated that he felt that the portrayal of characters was so good that he felt they "were actually talking to me" and expressed that he began to feel an emotional attachment to the plights of Raynor, commenting "When was the last time you could say that about a character in a strategy game?" A reader's poll for GameSpot voted Raynor one of video gaming's top ten heroes, complimenting Raynor's character on his humanity, his resilience in the face of consistent loss, as well as his progression from backwater marshal to galactic hero. GameSpot also gave additional praise to the quality of Robert Clotworthy's voice acting. In 2012, GamesRadar ranked him as the 80th "most memorable, influential, and badass" protagonist in games, commenting: "He embodies the concept of the greater good and is willing to put it all on the line to protect others. If you’re ever stuck in a sticky situation, whether it’s against a swarm of Zerg or a Protoss fleet, he’s the man you want to be fighting side by side with." In 2013, Complex ranked Raynor as the 24th greatest soldier in video games.

Raynor earned a nomination for Most Compelling Character at the second Annual Inside Gaming Awards in 2010, but lost to John Marston from the Red Dead video game series.

Further reading

Notes

References

External links
 Jim Raynor's biography on the official StarCraft II website.

Fictional alcohol abusers
Fictional criminals in video games
Fictional generals
Fictional marshals
Fictional mercenaries in video games
Fictional military captains
Fictional outlaws
Fictional police officers in video games
Fictional revolutionaries
Fictional soldiers in video games
Male characters in video games
Space marines
StarCraft characters
Video game characters introduced in 1998
Video game protagonists